The S.S. Grand View Point Hotel, also known as the Ship Hotel or Ship of the Alleghenies, was a historic hotel and roadside attraction in Juniata Township in Bedford County, Pennsylvania. It was built in 1927 as a hotel, but did not become the Ship Hotel until the additions which made it look like a ship were completed in 1932. The hotel was listed on the National Register of Historic Places in 1997, but after the hotel burned down in 2001 it was delisted in 2002.

Construction
The hotel was built in 1927, but was not transformed into the Ship Hotel until an expansion in 1932. Louis Franci and Emilio Rosso, Italian immigrants living in Allegheny County's Turtle Creek Valley, were hired as the construction managers. Rosso was a World War I veteran who had fought in the Meuse-Argonne Offensive and the Battle of Saint-Mihiel in 1917.

Herbert Paulson, a Dutch-born man, their supervisor, had the idea for what would become the landmark. The architect, Alfred Sinnhuber, was born in or around Berlin, Germany, and arrived in the U.S. in 1903. He often referred to himself as a "building designer" or architect and lived in Turtle Creek, but he also worked as a "checker" and lathe operator at the Westinghouse plant in East Pittsburgh. He was married to Elsa Marie Kristen and his children joined him in the plant. Working in the Westinghouse plant was the norm for those living in Pittsburgh and its suburbs, with Franci and Rosso likely working there at some point as well. All of these individuals would work together to build the Ship Hotel expansion. Allegedly, Paulson invited Franci and Rosso on a hunting trip, proposing to these two men the idea of expanding his existing hotel into the Ship Hotel.

As local historian Brian Butko notes, Paulson chose these two men, who lived near the Westinghouse plant where he (and they likely) worked, assuming that folks living in Turtle Creek Valley "knew all about building on steep hillsides." As Sinnhuber designed the new hotel and reportedly supervised the construction, Franci and Rosso were the construction managers. Paulson, who was a tool- and die-maker in the Pittsburgh plant, reportedly told the state government: "It's my property, either you let me build it or you buy the property!"

The construction itself began in October 1931. The ship design was chosen since fog in the valley reportedly looked like the sea. Paulson told them that they had from October until May of the following year to expand the hotel, a time frame of less than eight months, mostly in cold and snowy weather. A former owner of a car dealership in the area, Walter T. Matthews, told Butko that the ship needed over 63 tons of steel and cost about $125,000 to build, which was borrowed at 16% interest. Matthews further claimed that Franci and Rosso went broke in attempting to build the base of the hotel, having to drill down 32 feet to find rock. Additionally, the site was over 2,400 feet above sea level and 500 feet below the Allegheny Mountain summit, making it hard to build. Specifically, there was burrowing under the Lincoln Highway, or U.S. Route 30, in order to insert the three heavy I-beams, with embedded huge concrete piers allowing the ship to "ride." Other than the cement and 18 steel piers, numerous carloads of lumber were used for the 3/4-inch thick wood that was overlaid with metal siding, coming from at least 22 junked car frames, to cover the hotel's exterior. Also, nails and 72 tons of steel, by some counts, went into the construction of the expanded 5-floor-hotel, coupled with water piped from half-a-mile away.

While Franci and Rosso did manual work to build the expanded hotel, they had a crew which helped them with the laborious process of construction.

Grand opening and later years

After 1931, the Ship Hotel blossomed. At noon on May 29, 1932, after it was announced in the local Bedford Gazette, the ship opened, offering tours, staff inspections, and concerts. On that day, the Bedford American Legion Junior band, a local German band, and the Bedford High School band played, while a plane flew overhead dropping flowers on the ship's deck and a stilt walker entertained guests. The hotel was described as having "one of the most significant scenic views on the North American continent" with views of a fertile region of Pennsylvania, West Virginia, and of Maryland's rolling hills. The main claim was that you could see three states and seven counties from the ship, with no official list of what one could see from the ship itself.

As years went by, the hotel stayed on despite difficulties. The Paulson family lived on the ship and kept it running for many years, with Clara Paulson having the distinction as the only person who was born on the ship. Day-to-day entertainment included a local comedian, a grand orchestra, and much more, even when it was snow-bound in the winters. The ship was remodeled numerous times and thrived even with the building of the PA turnpike, suffered the brunt of anti-German discrimination during World War II, and stayed busy until the 1970s when public interest in roadside attractions began to wane.

By 1954, reportedly 2 million people had visited it, covering 20 volumes of registers, including those living in 62 foreign countries and possibly famous celebrities such as Calvin Coolidge, Henry Ford, and Thomas Edison.

Over the years, the hotel made much of its money in souvenirs and refreshments, starting in 1932 and until Paulson's death in 1973.

After 1978 the ship was turned into "Noah's Ark" by another family, the Loyas. From then on, the ship fell into disrepair, burning down in October 2001, reportedly due to lights kept on in the decaying structure to dissuade squatters.

References

External links

Grand View Ship Hotel Tribute Pages: Honoring the "Ship of the Alleghenies," 1932–2001

Historic American Engineering Record in Pennsylvania
Hotel buildings on the National Register of Historic Places in Pennsylvania
Hotel buildings completed in 1927
Buildings and structures in Bedford County, Pennsylvania
1927 establishments in Pennsylvania
2002 disestablishments in Pennsylvania
National Register of Historic Places in Bedford County, Pennsylvania
Former National Register of Historic Places in Pennsylvania